Dr. Sudam Kate is an Indian social activist doctor known for his pioneering work in the field of Sickle-Cell Anaemia in India.  Working with Maharashtra Arogya Mandal, Hadapsar, Pune; he helped diagnose and later treated over 3000 sickle cell patients from the rural tribal communities of Maharashtra, Gujarat and Madhya Pradesh, working since 1972. In 2017, the USA based NGO Sickle Cell 101 presented him with “2017 Sickle Cell Advocate of the Year”. He was presented with Padma Shri, India's 4th highest civilian award in 2019.

References

20th-century Indian medical doctors
Living people
Recipients of the Padma Shri in medicine
Medical doctors from Maharashtra
Indian health activists
Social workers
Year of birth missing (living people)